Explorer S-55 was an American satellite launched by NASA on 30 June 1961, as part of the Explorer program. Explorer S-55, was launched using a Scout X-1 launch vehicle from the Wallops Flight Facility (WFF). Its mission was to evaluate the launch vehicle, and investigate micrometeoroid impact and penetration. The mission failed because the third stage failed to ignite and the spacecraft did not achieve orbit.

Mission 
The objectives of the flight were to test vehicle performance and guidance and to investigate the nature and effects of micrometeoroids on the spacecraft systems. The scientific instrumentation consisted of cadmium sulfide-cell, wire-grid, piezoelectric, pressurized-cell, and foil-type micrometeoroid detectors.

Spacecraft 
The spacecraft was a  cylinder. Weighing , including its fourth stage and transition section, its objective was to test the performance of a Scout launch vehicle and its guidance system and to investigate the nature and effects of space flight on micrometeoroids. Its payload was a  cylinder, almost covered by five types of micometeoroid impact detectors, two transmitters, solar cells and nickel-cadmium batteries.

Launch 
Explorer S-55 was launched on 30 June 1961, at 17:09 GMT, in using a Scout X-1 launch vehicle. The mission failed because the third stage failed to ignite and the spacecraft did not achieve orbit.

See also 

Explorer 13

References 

Satellites of the United States
Explorers Program